Wall Spring, also known as Elliott Springs, is a historic mansion on a farm in Gallatin, Tennessee, U.S.. It was a horse farm in the Antebellum Era.

History
The house was built in 1827 for Colonel George Elliott, a veteran of the War of 1812 and the First Seminole War. Elliott bred horses on the farm. He was a co-founder of the Nashville Jockey Club in Nashville, Tennessee in 1807 alongside President Andrew Jackson and Governor Newton Cannon. His brother Charles lived at Walnut Grove nearby. Colonel Elliott died in 1861, and Wall Spring remained in the Elliott family until 1869.

Architectural significance
The house was first designed in the Federal architectural style. It was redesigned in the Italianate and Greek Revival architectural styles in the 1850s. It has been listed on the National Register of Historic Places since April 8, 1994.

References

Houses on the National Register of Historic Places in Tennessee
National Register of Historic Places in Sumner County, Tennessee
Federal architecture in Tennessee
Greek Revival architecture in Tennessee
Italianate architecture in Tennessee
Houses completed in 1827
Horse farms in Tennessee